Ebby is a given name. Notable people with the given name include:

Ebby DeWeese (1904–1942), American football player
Ebby Edwards (1884–1961), English trade unionist
Ebby Halliday (1911– 2015), American realtor
Ebby Nelson-Addy (born 1992), English footballer
Ebby Steppach (1997–2015), American murder victim
Ebby Thacher (1896–1966), sponsor of Alcoholics Anonymous co-founder Bill Wilson